Don Victoriano Chiongbian, officially the Municipality of Don Victoriano Chiongbian, is a 4th class municipality in the province of Misamis Occidental, Philippines. According to the 2020 census, it has a population of 9,664 people.

It was created on February 8, 1982, as Don Mariano Marcos under virtue of Batas Pambansa Blg. 171. It was renamed in 1986 to its current name in honor of its first municipal mayor. The municipality is home to Mount Malindang National Park.

Geography

Climate

Barangays
Don Victoriano Chiongbian is politically subdivided into 11 barangays.
 Bagong Clarin
 Gandawan
 Lake Duminagat
 Lalud
 Lampasan
 Liboron
 Maramara
 Napangan
 Nueva Vista (Mansawan)
 Petianan
 Tuno

Demographics

Economy

References

External links
 [ Philippine Standard Geographic Code]
Philippine Census Information
Local Governance Performance Management System 

Municipalities of Misamis Occidental